Daffy's Inn Trouble is a 1961 Warner Bros. Looney Tunes theatrical cartoon directed by Robert McKimson and written by David Detiege. The short was released on September 23, 1961, and stars Daffy Duck and Porky Pig.

Plot
Daffy Duck and Porky Pig work in the hotel business on the western frontier. At the start of the cartoon we see Daffy sweeping the floor, and exclaiming his dissatisfaction for his job. When Porky calls Daffy over, and gives him a new broom as a present, Daffy throws his hat on the floor in disgust and resigns.

Daffy then proceeds to build his own hotel business directly across the way from Porky.  Porky looks on, exclaiming all that because he gave Daffy a present. Daffy does everything he can to persuade business to his new establishment, hanging signs reading 'Free Lunch', 'Free TV', 'We Give Plaid Stamps' and 'Western Spoken Here'. After Porky wishes Daffy luck, Daffy spots a customer whom he hastily invites to his newly built establishment. Upon his arrival to the hotel, Daffy tries to take the gentleman's order, but is instead robbed.

Despite Daffy's many attempts at wooing customers with his free advertisements, Porky's establishment is receiving all the business. Daffy wonders what Porky has that he does not, so he wanders over to take a peek. Daffy sees a (live action) vaudeville show. Determined to fight fire with fire, Daffy goes back to his hotel dressed up as a girl and then dances/lip-syncs to a record playing "The Latin Quarter" (from the 1938 Warner Brothers musical, Gold Diggers in Paris) on the front porch to sway potential customers away from Porky's establishment. This works well until the record starts skipping and the bystanders realize what's going on. Greatly insulted by Daffy's deceptive marketing ploy, they all throw fruits and vegetables at him. Daffy then attempts to join forces with Porky and asks him to be partners. When Porky replies by telling Daffy he has all the business he needs, Daffy menaces him with a gun, but accidentally shoots himself instead, and then decides to destroy Porky's business by force.

First, Daffy tries to drop a boulder from a cliff onto Porky's hotel, which backfires: the boulder misses, bounces, and crushes Daffy's hotel instead. This reverse makes Daffy's head transform into that of a braying jackass. Daffy then decides to dress up like a woman, in order to place explosives under the floor boards of Porky's hotel. However, while Porky leaves the hotel to attend to the lady, the explosives go off, and we see that Porky has struck oil. We then see that Porky's hotel is destroyed (as it was on top of the oil gusher) and closed, with a sign posted reading "moved to a new location." The camera pans over to Porky's new and improved five-star hotel, in which Daffy now works for Porky again.  Porky offers Daffy the chance to 'clean up', and gives him his own office. When he opens the door to his office, several brooms and mops fall out of the closet. Daffy then picks up a 'janitor' hat and puts it on, and tells the audience that if Porky "put his mind to it, he could be positively obnoxious" as the cartoon irises out.

Home media
Daffy's Inn Trouble is available on Looney Tunes Super Stars' Daffy Duck: Frustrated Fowl. However, it is cropped to widescreen.

See also
 List of American films of 1961
 List of cartoons featuring Daffy Duck
 List of cartoons featuring Porky Pig

References

External links
 

1961 animated films
1961 short films
1961 films
Looney Tunes shorts
Films directed by Robert McKimson
Daffy Duck films
Porky Pig films
1960s Warner Bros. animated short films
Films scored by Milt Franklyn
1960s English-language films
Films set in hotels